Four distinct awards have been named for writer, chemist, and humanist Isaac Asimov.
 The Isaac Asimov Award for Undergraduate Excellence in Science Fiction and Fantasy Short Story Writing, now known as the Dell Magazines Award, is an annual award open to undergraduate college students and given to the author of the best science fiction or fantasy short story.  Established by the magazine Asimov's Science Fiction and the International Association for the Fantastic in the Arts, the award is typically given for character-driven stories of the type published in that magazine.
 The ASIMOV Prize for popular science books, edited in the Italian language. Its organising committee is composed by several hundred of professors and PhD students from all over Italy. Originally established at Gran Sasso Science Institute, it grew and became a national prize thanks to INFN and many other scientific institutions. The winner is selected by a large jury of high school students, about 3300 in the last edition.  The 1st recipient (2016) was the chemist Peter Atkins, the 2nd one (2017) was the medical doctor Roberto Burioni, the 3rd ones (2018) are Helen Czerski and Marco Malvaldi ex aequo , the 4th one the neurophysiologist Lamberto Maffei. The winner of the 5th (2020) edition is the mathematician Hannah Fry.
 The skeptical organization CSICOP created an Isaac Asimov Award, established in 1994 "to honor Asimov for his extraordinary contributions to science and humanity".  The first recipient was Asimov's friend Carl Sagan. Stephen Jay Gould was also a winner.
 In 1998, the American Humanist Association awarded its first Isaac Asimov Award to Eugenie Scott. Awardees since then have included Robert Sapolsky, Neil deGrasse Tyson, Steve Wozniak, Richard Leakey and Lynn J. Rothschild.

References

External links
 Award information from Asimov's
 List of past winners of the Isaac Asimov Award for Undergraduate Excellence in Science Fiction and Fantasy Short Story Writing / Dell Magazines Award

American literary awards
Isaac Asimov
Asimov